Nerodia rhombifer, commonly known as the diamondback water snake, is a species of nonvenomous natricine colubrid endemic to the central United States and northern Mexico. There are three recognized subspecies of N. rhombifer, including the nominotypical subspecies.

Taxonomy and systematics
The species was first described as Tropidonotus rhombifer by Edward Hallowell in 1852.

Description
The diamondback water snake is predominantly brown, dark brown, or dark olive green in color, with a black net-like pattern along the back, with each spot being vaguely diamond-shaped. Dark vertical bars and lighter coloring are often present down the sides of the snake. In typical counter-colored fashion, the underside is generally a yellow or lighter brown color, often with black blotching.

The dorsal scales are heavily keeled, giving the snake a rough texture. The dorsal scales are arranged in 25 or 27 rows at midbody. There are usually 3 postoculars.

Adult males have multiple papillae (tubercles) on the under surface of the chin, which are not found on any other species of snake in the United States.

Neonates are often lighter in color, making their patterns more pronounced, and they darken with age.

Habitat
The diamondback water snake is one of the most common species of snake within its range. It is found predominantly near slow-moving bodies of water such as streams, rivers, ponds, or swamps.

Behavior
When foraging for food the diamondback water snake will hang on branches suspended over the water, dipping its head under the surface of the water, until it encounters a fish or other prey. It is frequently found basking on branches over water, and when approached, it will quickly drop into the water and swim away. If cornered, it will often hiss, and flatten the head and body to appear larger. It only typically resorts to biting if physically harassed or handled. Its bite is known to be quite painful due to its sharp teeth meant to keep hold of slippery fish. This defensive behavior is frequently misinterpreted as aggression and often leads to its being mistaken for the venomous cottonmouth (Agkistrodon piscivorus), with which it does share habitat in some places. The brown/tan coloration and diamond-shaped pattern also causes it to be mistaken for rattlesnakes, especially when encountered on land by individuals unfamiliar with snakes.

Geographic range
The diamondback water snake is found in the central United States, predominantly along the Mississippi River valley, but its range extends beyond that. It ranges within the states of Texas, Oklahoma, Kansas, Iowa, Louisiana, Arkansas, Missouri, Illinois, Indiana, Tennessee, Mississippi, Georgia, and Alabama. It is also found in northern Mexico, in the states of Coahuila, Nuevo León, Tamaulipas, and Veracruz.

This snake has been introduced to Lafayette Reservoir in Contra Costa County, California. It was first observed in the late 1980s and had reached high densities in the early 1990s, causing fisherman and other visitors to complain as they believed that the snakes were eating the reservoir's fish, frogs and, turtles—mostly stocked fish, American bullfrogs, and red-eared sliders—all non-native species too. In 1996 a contract was awarded to a wildlife control company to cull the snake population. Just when the control effort began in late 1997, dead watersnakes and turtles were observed in large numbers. The precise cause of the die-off is unknown, but a respiratory tract fungus was found in dissected snakes. A cause for the outbreak might have been an abnormally wet and cold El Niño weather system. There have been no confirmed observations of watersnakes at Lafayette Reservoir since late 1999, but sightings are occasionally reported, and the population may still continue to present in low numbers.

Reproduction
Like other Nerodia species, the diamondback water snake is ovoviviparous. Adults breed in the spring, and gravid females give birth in the late summer or early fall. Though its range overlaps with several other species of water snakes, interbreeding is not known.

Conservation concerns
While not endangered or threatened, the main threat to N. rhombifer is human ignorance. The diamondback water snake is often mistaken for the cottonmouth or rattlesnakes and is killed out of fear. In actuality, the diamondback water snake and other species of water snakes are far more common than the venomous snakes in their range, especially in areas that are frequented by humans.

In captivity
Due to how common the species is, the diamondback water snake is frequently found in captivity, though there is little market value for it in the pet trade. Captive specimens will often bite when captured but become fairly docile with regular handling. It may also defecate when handled, which has a particularly offensive smell, probably due to the diet of mostly fish. It eats quite well in captivity if fed primarily fish but must be supplemented with vitamin B1. Larger specimens will often consume rodents..

References

Further reading
Behler JL, King FW (1979). The Audubon Society Field Guide to North American Reptiles and Amphibians. New York: Alfred A. Knopf. 743 pp., 657 color plates. . (Nerodia rhombifera, pp. 636-637 + Plate 574).
Cagle FR (1937). "Notes on Natrix rhombifera as observed at Reelfoot Lake". Journ. Tennessee Acad. Sci. 12: 179-185.
Clay WM (1938). "A new water snake of the genus Natrix from Mexico". Annals of the Carnegie Museum 27: 251-255. (Natrix rhombifera blanchardi, new subspecies).
Conant R (1953). "Three new water snakes of the genus Natrix from Mexico". Natural History Miscellanea 126: 1-9. (Natrix rhombifera werleri, new subspecies, p. 4).
Conant R, Bridges W (1939). What Snake Is That? A Field Guide to the Snakes of the United States East of the Rocky Mountains. (With 108 drawings by Edmond Malnate). New York and London: D. Appleton-Century. Frontispiece map + viii + 163 pp. + Plates A-C, 1-32. (Natrix rhombifera rhombifera, p. 96 + Plate 17, figure 48).
Gibbons JW, Dorcas ME (2004). North American Water Snakes: A Natural History. (Foreword by Roger Conant). Norman, Oklahoma: University of Oklahoma Press. 496 pp. .
Hallowell E (1852). "Descriptions of new species of reptiles inhabiting North America". Proc. Acad. Nat. Sci. Philadelphia 6: 177-182. (Tropidonotus rhombifer, new species, p. 177).
Schmidt KP, Davis DD (1941). Field Book of Snakes of the United States and Canada. New York: G.P. Putnam's Sons. 365 pp. (Natrix rhombifera rhombifera, pp. 217–218, Figure 71 + Plate 23, Bottom, on p. 343).
Wright AH, Wright AA (1957). Handbook of Snakes of the United States and Canada. Ithaca and London: Comstock. 1,105 pp. (in 2 volumes). (Natrix rhombifera rhombifera, pp. 500–504, Figure 147, Map 41.)

External links

Diamondback Water Snake, Reptiles and Amphibians of Iowa

rhombifer
Reptiles of Mexico
Reptiles of the United States
Extant Cenozoic first appearances
Reptiles described in 1852
Taxa named by Edward Hallowell (herpetologist)